Marijus Mikutavičius (born 19 April 1971), known better as Marijonas Mikutavičius, is a Lithuanian singer, musician and songwriter, a television journalist, a comedian and a talk show host from Vilnius. He is best known for his sports anthem  Trys Milijonai as well as an official Eurobasket 2011 song Celebrate Basketball and for representing his country at Eurovision Song Contest 2006 as part of LT United.

Early life and education
Born in Lazdijai, at the age of nine Mikutavičius moved with the family to Vilnius where he later entered, and in 1994 graduated the Faculty of Communication of the Vilnius University as a master in journalism.

Career
While studying at the university, Mikutavičius worked for periodicals and as a Vakaro žinios (Evening News) reporter for Lithuanian television. He also played in a rock band  Bovy, which toured around Europe and sang in Scandinavian countries, Germany, and Eastern Europe, and gained recognition as the best vocalist at the Liepājas dzintars (Liepāja's amber) music festival in 1995.

He has been working as a screenwriter and a participant in a variety of programs, usually youth oriented, on Lithuanian National Radio and Television and on major commercial TV channels LNK and Lithuanian TV3. He has hosted Vakaras su Marijonu (An Evening with Marijonas), a talk show on LNK.  He also works as a Lietuvos rytas daily (Lithuanian Morning) correspondent.

Mikutavičius is the author of a number of hit songs which stand at the top of the music charts in Lithuania.  As the author of the popular song Trys Milijonai, he became a Bravo 2000  music award winner (Bravo is a Lithuanian analogue of BRIT Awards voted by the music industry people); he is also a recipient of the Radiocentras music award (voted by the listeners).

In 2004, a Lithuanian music recording company "Intervid" released his album Pasveikinkit vieni kitus (Greeting Each Other), which included two versions of "Trys Milijonai". This album reached the platinum award for sales in Lithuania (sold 20,000 copies early in 2004 and more than 30,000 copies by 2005). In February and March 2005, saw a controversy in the media, which arose from the rumors that Mikutavičius apparently, unilaterally sold the rights of the song for five years to "Intervid".

Albums
 "Lengvas būdas mesti klausytis" ("Easy Way to Stop Listening") (2014)
 "Baigėme mokyklą" ("We Finished School") (2008)
 "Pasveikinkit vieni kitus" ("Greet Each Other") (2004)

Singles

 "Velnias, man patinka Kalėdos" ("Damn, I Like Christmas")
 "Pakeliui Namo" ("On Our Way Home")
 "Aš miręs" ("I'm Dead")
  "Trys Milijonai" ("Three Million"), a hit song; the official song for Lithuania at the Sydney Olympic Games and a popular unofficial Lithuanian sports anthem
 "Nebetyli Sirgaliai" (Celebrate Basketball), a hit song; which is extremely catchy; the official basketball anthem for the 2011 Basketball Euro Championships (hosted in Lithuania); represent the nation's faith and passion for Basketball

External links
 Marijonas Mikutavičius biography
 Marijonas "Pasveikinkit vieni kitus" introduction, The Baltic Times, early 2004
  Intervid: Marijonas "Pasveikinkit vieni kitus" album
 Marijonas Mikutavicius's Unofficial Fan Website

1971 births
Living people
Journalists from Vilnius
21st-century Lithuanian male singers
Lithuanian pop singers
Lithuanian television presenters
Musicians from Vilnius
People from Lazdijai
Vilnius University alumni
Eurovision Song Contest entrants of 2006
Eurovision Song Contest entrants for Lithuania